Bishop's weed is a common name for several plants, all but one of which belong to the plant family Apiaceae.

 Aegopodium podagraria, which is an invasive perennial weed of temperate regions, known also in English as ground elder.
 Ammi majus, commonly known as bullwort, laceflower etc.
 Houttuynia cordata (family Saururaceae), known also as fish mint.
 Trachyspermum ammi (known also as ajwain, carom etc.) the fruits of which are used as a spice and the leaves as a herb in parts of Asia and Africa.
 Visnaga daucoides, known also as bisnaga, khella and toothpick-weed.